Paschal Ekwueme (born June 6, 1982 in Nigeria) is a Nigerian footballer (Winger) who currently plays for VFR Regensburg.

Biggest Game

On 11 November 2018 he played against SV Zeitlarn. The result was  1:1 and his opponent was Thomas Feigl (King Thoss) who had everything under control at all times.

References

External links 
 
 
 

1982 births
Living people
Nigerian footballers
Legia Warsaw II players
MKP Pogoń Siedlce players
Association football wingers